The End of the Affair is a 1955 British-American drama romance film directed by Edward Dmytryk, based on Graham Greene's 1951 novel of the same name. The film stars Deborah Kerr, Van Johnson, John Mills and Peter Cushing. It was filmed largely on location in London, particularly in and around Chester Terrace. The film was entered into the 1955 Cannes Film Festival.

Plot
Writer Maurice Bendrix settles in London in 1943-44 after being wounded in the war. His affair with Sarah Miles, wife of civil servant Henry Miles, "grows into a deep and abiding passion." Maurice becomes jealous. He wants to marry, but she won't leave Henry, yet.

The apartment Maurice lives in is hit by a buzz bomb. He revives, pulls himself from rubble to find Sarah kneeling on the floor of his room. As she tends to his wounds, he asks why she was kneeling. She says she was praying and was certain he was dead. She stares at him, her face wet with tears, then leaves abruptly. He runs after her to find the street empty. Maurice suffers from delayed shock and is bedridden for several days. When he recovers, he tries to reach Sarah, in vain, and his "jealousy turns to hate."

A year later, the war is over. Maurice struggles with his book and his hate for Sarah. One rainy night, he sees Henry. Henry is worried about Sarah, and invites Maurice to his home for a drink. Sarah, who "is out at all hours" returns home soaking wet, and is vague and detached with both of them.

Maurice confronts Sarah, who takes all the blame. Parkis, a private investigator, reports to Maurice in the darkened flat. He describes Maurice's meeting with Sarah in detail, interpreting it as a final parting and describing Sarah as "looking ready to weep her eyes out." Maurice reveals himself, saying the parting was long ago.

Parkis has the bottom of a discarded note in Sarah's handwriting that reads "nothing matters except that we should be together, now and forever." Parkis obtains Sarah's journal, observing that she appears to be very ill.

Maurice reads the journal. We hear Sarah's voice describing the past year. Maurice lies in the rubble.  She takes his hand, then returns to his room. Weeping, she prays: "I love him, I'll do anything... I'll give Maurice up forever, only just let him be alive!" Maurice calls her name. She plans to tell him about her "hysterical" promise, but then he seems to remember what it was like to be dead. "Now the agony of being without you starts," she writes. At home, Henry tells her that Maurice has been taken to a hospital with delayed shock.

Suddenly Sarah wants Maurice beside her. She confides in a Catholic priest and asks: "What does God want with me?" She lights a candle and for the first time in months feels "a little tremble of happiness." At home, she finds Maurice with Henry. It took "everything she had" to walk up the stairs. She writes a love letter, records it in the diary and tears it up, creating the scrap of paper Parkis found.

She tells her friend, Richard Smythe, that she is going back to Maurice because she believes that God will love her even if she breaks her vow. But when Henry tells her how much he needs her, she promises not to leave him. The diary ends with a cry of pain and love for Maurice. He closes the journal and phones her.

She begs him not to come. He pursues her to the church, through pouring rain, promising they will be together. Maurice comes to the house and finds Sarah is dying.

At home, he finds a letter from Sarah that says she can never see him again, and that she has never loved as she loves him. Maurice replies: "Have it your way Sarah. I believe that you live and that He exists. But I'm tired. Just give me a little time..."

Cast

Reception 
The New York Times’  Bosley Crowther had harsh words for Lenore Coffee’s adaptation of the novel.  “It is too bad the drama is so muddy, for the cast is good for this film. Miss Kerr is ideal for the lady and Van Johnson is apt for the man. Peter Cushing as the lady's cryptic husband and John Mills as a jaunty private-eye are also exceedingly potential in the only other fair-size roles. But the story just is not articulate, so no matter how diligently and well Edward Dmytryk has directed, it all comes out cluttered and cold."

Release

Home media
This film was released on DVD on 16 May 2000. The DVD contains both the 1955 and 1999 adaptations of the novel, together with supporting material about their making.

References

Further reading
 Tibbetts, John C., and James M. Welsh, eds. The Encyclopedia of Novels Into Film (2nd ed. 2005) pp 117–118.

External links
 
 
 
 

1955 romantic drama films
1950s war drama films
1955 films
Adultery in films
British black-and-white films
British romantic drama films
British war drama films
Columbia Pictures films
1950s English-language films
Films based on British novels
Films based on romance novels
Films based on works by Graham Greene
Films directed by Edward Dmytryk
Films scored by Benjamin Frankel
Films set in London
Films set on the home front during World War II
Films shot at Shepperton Studios
Films shot in London
War romance films
1950s British films
American black-and-white films